1847 in archaeology

Explorations
 Austen Henry Layard begins his examination of Nineveh which continue until 1851.

Excavations

Publications
 Antiquités Celtiques et antédiluviennes, vol. 1, by Jacques Boucher de Crèvecœur de Perthes.
 The History of the Conquest of Peru by William H. Prescott.

Births
 June 9 – John Romilly Allen, British archaeologist (d. 1907)

Deaths

See also
 List of years in archaeology
 1846 in archaeology
 1848 in archaeology

References

1847 archaeological discoveries
Archaeology by year
Archaeology